The Sota is a river of northern Benin flowing through the departments of Borgou and Alibori. It is a tributary of the Niger River and the Tassiné River is one of its tributaries. The river is approximately 250 km in length and covers a basin area of 13,650 km2.

Geography
The Sota rises northeast of the town of Ndali in the territory of Benin in Borgou Department. The river runs toward the north-north-east and empties into the Niger River at Malanville.

Rainfall
The annual precipitation has been recorded at several stations in the basin of the Sota: 

Segbana (center-east of the basin, near the Nigerian border): 1177.4 mm spread over 53 days.
Kandi (center-west of the basin): 1055.1 mm, spread over 80 days
Malanville (at the north end of the basin at the confluence with Niger): 919.9 mm in 53 days
There is everywhere a large surplus rainfall from July to September (boreal summer), giving rise to violent floods, but the deficit is a severe dry season from December to April.

Hydrometry
The flow of the river has been observed for 40 years (1953-1992) at the hydro station in Couberi, located near its confluence with the Niger River at Malanville.

At Couberi, the average annual flow module or observed during this period was 31 m³ / second for an area taking into account 9111 to 13,410 km ². The monthly average flows observed from February to April are from 3.7 to 3.9 m³ / second, which is quite remarkable in Africa at its discretion, with other rivers in the region falling consistently enough to nearly dry up in the dry season. It is true that the level of rainfall of 900 to 1200 mm per year is very consistent. On the observation period of 40 years, the minimum monthly flow was 2 m³ / second, while the maximum monthly flow amounted to 358 m³ / second which is more than the average flow of the Seine in Paris.

Average monthly flows of Sota (m³ / second) measured at the hydrometric station Couberi. (Data calculated over 40 years)

References

External links
 www-naweb.iaea.org 

Rivers of Benin
Tributaries of the Niger River